Michael John Mario Karney (born July 6, 1981) is a former American football player who was a fullback in the National Football League (NFL) for seven seasons.  He played college football for Arizona State University.  He was drafted by the New Orleans Saints in the fifth round of the 2004 NFL Draft, and also played for the NFL's St. Louis Rams.

Early years
Karney was born  in San Jose, California.  He was raised in Kent, Washington and attended Kentwood High School in Covington, Washington and garnered varsity letters in football and baseball. In football, he was a USA Today High School All-American selection, a PrepStar all-region honoree, named the No. 15 player in the Northwest. Karney rushed for 800 yards and 22 touchdowns as a senior as his team went to the Class 4A state title game, its first appearance in 10 years.

College career
While attending Arizona State University, Karney played for the Arizona State Sun Devils football team.  He started 28 of 46 games for the Sun Devils and had 78 yards on 32 carries and 37 receptions for 308 yards and a touchdown.  Karney is said to have trained in college by strapping his car to his back and attempt to pull it around. As a senior, he recorded 14 catches for 106 yards and in 2002, opened 11 of 14 games, posting 20 rushing yards on eight carries and hauling in 13 passes for 121 yards. All Pac-10 selection in 2001, opening seven games and playing in every contest. That season had six carries for 18 yards and caught six passes for 39 yards, including a seven-yard touchdown vs. San Diego State.

Professional career

Pre-draft

Karney was rated as one of the top fullbacks coming out of college.

New Orleans Saints
Karney was drafted in the fifth round of the 2004 NFL Draft by the New Orleans Saints. Karney was signed to three-year $1.3 million contract on July 29, 2004, and proved to be a solid lead blocker and average receiver out of the backfield.  The Saints gave up two picks to draft Karney. In his first two seasons he started 22 of 32 games. He was re-signed to a contract extension prior to the 2006 season (July 13, 2006). The extension was for a reported four-years and $5.6 million including incentives, and included a $1.2 million signing bonus. On December 10, 2006, against the Dallas Cowboys on Sunday Night Football, Karney had his best NFL game, scoring two receiving and one rushing touchdowns, his first three touchdowns in the NFL. After the 2006 season, Karney was voted All-pro.

St. Louis Rams
Karney signed a three-year, $4.9 million contract with the St. Louis Rams on March 11, 2009. The deal includes $1.7 million guaranteed. Karney was needed because, according to ESPN's John Clayton, "The Rams have been struggling at that position since they released Madison Hedgecock early in 2007." Hedgecock ended up starting for the New York Giants in Super Bowl XLII and was Second-team All-Pro and Pro Bowl alternate in 2008. On the day of the Karney signing, Rams head coach Steve Spagnuolo said, "Mike has proven to be a solid fullback since entering the league in 2004. We are excited that he is now a Ram and we looking forward to him being an effective part of our offense in the future." Steven Jackson echoed that saying, "I've seen the holes that he's opened up…I'm looking forward to working with him."

On February 8, 2011, the Rams released Karney.

Seattle Seahawks
Karney visited with the Seahawks on August 30, 2011, but was not signed to a contract by Seattle.

References

External links
Arizona State Sun Devils bio
St. Louis Rams bio

1981 births
Living people
Players of American football from San Jose, California
American football fullbacks
Arizona State Sun Devils football players
New Orleans Saints players
St. Louis Rams players
Kentwood High School (Washington) alumni